The 2018 Almaty Challenger 2 was a professional tennis tournament played on hard courts. It was the third edition of the tournament which was part of the 2018 ATP Challenger Tour. It took place in Almaty, Kazakhstan between 1 and 6 October 2018.

Singles main draw entrants

Seeds

 1 Rankings are as of 24 September 2018.

Other entrants
The following players received entry into the singles main draw as wildcards:
  Sagadat Ayap
  Dostanbek Tashbulatov
  Denis Yevseyev

The following players received entry from the qualifying draw:
  Antoine Escoffier
  Teymuraz Gabashvili
  Illya Marchenko
  Khumoyun Sultanov

The following players received entry as lucky losers:
  Artem Dubrivnyy
  Rubin Statham

Champions

Singles

 Denis Istomin def.  Nikola Milojević 6–7(4–7), 7–6(7–5), 6–2.

Doubles

 Zdeněk Kolář /  Lukáš Rosol def.  Evgeny Karlovskiy /  Timur Khabibulin 6–3, 6–1.

References

Almaty Challenger 2
October 2018 sports events in Kazakhstan
2018 in Kazakhstani sport